Panare may refer to
 Panare people, Venezuela
 Panare language, Venezuela
 Panare District, Thailand

Language and nationality disambiguation pages